The 26th government of Turkey (20 November 1961 – 25 June 1962), also known as the first coalition government of Turkey and the eight government of İsmet İnönü, was the first civilian government following the 1960 Turkish coup d'état. The prime minister, İsmet İnönü, was the leader of the Republican People's Party (CHP) and a former president of Turkey. The CHP was joined in coalition by the Justice Party (AP).

Election

In the elections held on 15 October 1961, CHP received 36.7%, and AP received 34.8%. Thus, CHP gained 173 seats and AP gained 158 seats in the 450-seat parliament. İnönü formed the first coalition government in the history of Turkey with AP. AP claimed to be the successor of Democrat Party (DP), which had been banned by the leaders of the 1960 coup. İnönü's main objective was to end the tension between the former coup leaders and the Justice Party. In the relatively short span of time in which the 26th government existed, the Justice Party tried to lift the ban on DP politicians, but the former coup partisans opposed this policy. On 22 February 1962, Turkey was faced again with an attempted coup, but İnönü managed to suppress it.

The government
Some of the cabinet members were changed during the lifespan of the cabinet. In the list below, the serving period of cabinet members who served only a part of the cabinets lifespan are shown in the column "Notes".

Aftermath
In the last month of the coalition government, the main issue was the idea of an amnesty act for the former DP members. According to an interview, İnönü thought that the split of opinion on this issue made the government nonfunctional, and he resigned.

References

İsmet İnönü
Republican People's Party (Turkey) politicians
Justice Party (Turkey) politicians
Cabinets of Turkey
1961 establishments in Turkey
1962 disestablishments in Turkey
Cabinets established in 1961
Cabinets disestablished in 1962
Coalition governments of Turkey
Members of the 26th government of Turkey
12th parliament of Turkey
Republican People's Party (Turkey)